Praise & Blame is the 38th studio album by Welsh musician Tom Jones, released 26 July 2010. The album was Jones' first release with Island Records and was recorded in 2009 at the Real World Studios in Wiltshire, England. Produced by Ethan Johns, Praise & Blame was made up of largely little known devotional and gospel covers, marking a departure from the pop-orientated style that had dominated Jones' recent recordings.

Reception

Critical response
Upon its release, Praise & Blame received generally positive reviews from most critics. Giving the album four stars, Andrew Perry in The Daily Telegraph claimed that the album was "by far Jones' best album in two decades" and stated that "with its loose, spontaneous sound, and the all-pervasive sense of artistic rebirth…it’s a revelation." Similarly, Andy Gill in The Independent stated: "Overall, it's an extraordinary achievement: Praise & Blame represents the kind of reconnection with his core creative fire that was hinted on a few tracks of his last album, 24 Hours, but is here left naked and bleeding raw, bereft of showbiz blandishments". Giving the album five stars, Gill labelled the album one of the best in Jones' six decade long career.

The album's stripped-down production and focus upon spiritual songs gained numerous comparisons to Johnny Cash's American series and Elvis Presley's 1968 comeback. Writing in American Songwriter, Rick Moore applauded the song selection and stated that  "on this excellent collection of songs examining the human condition, Jones confronts the issues of heaven and hell in a way that Cash did for much of his life, especially toward the end of it… [Tom] Jones and [Ethan] Johns have made a real statement in the same way that Rubin, and of course T Bone Burnett, do almost every time they produce an album." Writing in The New York Times, Stephen Holden states that Jones' vocal delivery "conveys the contrition of a sinner as he delivers a mixture of traditional spirituals and contemporary gospel songs tautly arranged for a small band. It is a respectful, expressively focused exploration of a genre beloved by Mr. Jones’s American counterpart, Elvis Presley."

The change of musical direction, together with stripped down, live production – much at odds with Jones' traditional style – led Michael Hann in The Guardian to state "at last Jones the artist is the match of Jones the entertainer." Allison Stewart, writing in The Washington Post, stated that Praise & Blame is "Jones's "O Brother," "Raising Sand" and "Ain't No Grave" all rolled into one, a mixed bag of roots-related styles – blues, gospel-lite, country-folk, rockabilly, soul – stripped of all fat and reduced to the barest elements of voice and spartan, if often electrified, instrumentation. The song choices are impeccable, from a thunderous cover of Bob Dylan's "Oh Mercy" standout "What Good Am I?" to a holy roller redo of John Lee Hooker's "Burning Hell," all propelled by Jones's remarkable voice, still a marvel of quaveriness and bluster and sinew after all these years."

Track listing

Note: Traditional songs recorded are listed in the album notes as “Written By Tom Jones and Ethan Johns, Published by EMI Music Publishing.”

Personnel
 Tom Jones – vocals
 Ethan Johns – banjo, bass (Track 11), guitar, percussion, producer, mellotron, omnichord, mixing
 Booker T. Jones – piano, Track 4, hammond B3, Track 2
 Mat Arnold – assistant engineer
 Dave Bronze – bass guitar, Tracks 1, 2, 4, 6, 7, 8, 9, & 10
 Richard Causon – harmonium, Track 3
 B. J. Cole – steel guitar, Tracks 1 & 10
 Christopher Holland - organ, Track 1
 Ian Jennings – bass guitar, Track 3
 Andy Kitchen – assistant engineer
 Bob Ludwig – mastering
 Augie Meyers – Farfisa organ, Track 1
 Benmont Tench – piano, Track 9
 Billy Mims – assistant engineer
 Dominic Monks – engineer, mixing
 Henry Spinetti – drums, Track 3
 Jeremy Stacey – drums, Tracks 1, 2, 4, 5, 6, 7, 8, 9, 10, & 11
 Allison Pierce – backing vocalist
 Louis Price – backing vocalist
 David Rawlings – backing vocalist
 Camilla Staveley-Taylor – backing vocalist
 Emily Staveley-Taylor – backing vocalist
 Jessica Staveley-Taylor – backing vocalist
 Oren Waters  – backing vocalist
 Gillian Welch  – backing vocalist
 Terry Young  – backing vocalist

Chart positions

Weekly charts

Year-end charts

Certifications

Release history

References

2010 albums
Tom Jones (singer) albums
Albums produced by Ethan Johns
Island Records albums
Covers albums